, better known by its brand name CatEye, is a Japanese company. It is a manufacturer of cycle computers, lights, reflectors, toe clips, bottle cages and other accessories which sell worldwide. The company was founded in 1954 in Osaka, Japan and developed the first flashing bicycle light in 1964, and other innovations that it first introduced into the marketplace include flashing LED headlamps. It released its first cycle computer in 1981.

As of 2015 it employs 202 people. While the company's head office and design teams are in Japan, today many components are manufactured in its Chinese factories and subsidiaries.

References

External links 

 

Cycle parts manufacturers
Sporting goods manufacturers of Japan
Manufacturing companies established in 1954
1954 establishments in Japan
Japanese brands
Manufacturing companies based in Osaka